Forever Malcolm Young is the seventh studio album by Australian punk band Frenzal Rhomb. It was released in Australia on 14 October 2006.

The performers were Jay Whalley (credited as 'Jayden Whalley') on vocals and backing guitar, Lindsay McDougall (credited as 'The Good Doctor') on lead guitar, Gordy Foreman (credited as 'The Arsechest Formerly known as Poonce') on drums and Tom Crease (credited as 'Brigadier Tom Cruise') on bass guitar. All members provide backing vocals.

The album has a guest appearance from Whalley's wife Lauren, on the song "Please Go Over There". Lauren also appeared in "Bucket Bong" on the Sans Souci album.

The album's title is a parody of the 1984 Alphaville song "Forever Young" and AC/DC's rhythm guitarist Malcolm Young.

The first pressing of the record was sold with a DVD titled Sucking All Over the World which has live performances and behind-the-scenes footage with the band.

Track listing

Charts

References

2006 albums
Epitaph Records albums
Frenzal Rhomb albums